Philippe Agut (1 August 1929 – 23 October 1988) was a French professional racing cyclist. He rode in three editions of the Tour de France.

References

External links
 

1929 births
1988 deaths
French male cyclists
Sportspeople from Aude
Cyclists from Occitania (administrative region)